National road 19 is part of the Polish national road network. The highway connects the north-eastern and southern regions of Poland, running from Kuźnica at the Belarus border to Barwinek at the Slovak border, traversing through the Podlaskie, Masovian, Lublin and Podkarpackie voivodeships. National road 19 is part of European highway E371.

Until the 1980s way between Lublin and Rzeszów was marking the national road No. 26, and between Lublin and Radzyń Podlaski national road No. 24. The remaining length of the route did not have the status of national road. After renumbering of roads, route 19 near Białystok led in the direction of Augustów, Suwałki, to the border in Budzisko (today's Route 8 E67). Later changed course from Białystok towards Sokółka to the border in Kuźnica (former road No. 18).

Major cities and towns along the route
 Kuźnica (border with Belarus)
 Sokółka
 Sochonie (road 8)
 Białystok (road 8, 65)
 Bielsk Podlaski (road 66)
 Siemiatycze (road 62)
 Łosice
 Międzyrzec Podlaski (road 2)
 Radzyń Podlaski (road 63)
 Kock (road 48)
 Lublin (S12, S17)
 Kraśnik (road 74)
 Janów Lubelski (road 74)
 Nisko (road 77)
 Rzeszów (road 9, road 94)
 Miejsce Piastowe (road 28)
 Barwinek (border with Slovakia)

19